Silvia Gmür (17 September 1939 – 24 January 2022) was a Swiss architect.

After earning a degree from ETH Zurich in 1964, she worked in Paris, London, and New York City with Mitchell-Giurgola from 1966 to 1972. That year, she founded her own agency in Basel and partnered with Livio Vacchini from 1995 to 2001.

Gmür was also a professor at ETH Zurich from 1979 to 1985.

An exhibition of her projects was displayed at the Harvard Graduate School of Design in 2014, the same year in which a similar exhibition was held at the Galerie d'Architecture in Paris.

Awards
Progressive Architecture Award (1977)
 (2011)

References

1939 births
2022 deaths
People from Zürich
Swiss women architects